The men's halfpipe competition of the 2015 Winter Universiade was held at Sulayr Snowpark, Sierra Nevada, Spain at February 7, 2015.

Results

Qualification

Final

Men's halfpipe